Ivan Sergeyevich Drannikov (born 22 July 1986) is a Russian professional football coach and a former player. He works as a fitness coach with Shinnik Yaroslavl.

Club career
He played 8 seasons in the Russian Football National League for 5 different clubs.

External links 
 
 

1986 births
Sportspeople from Rostov-on-Don
Living people
Russian footballers
Association football midfielders
FC Rostov players
FC Sodovik Sterlitamak players
FC Torpedo-BelAZ Zhodino players
FC SKA Rostov-on-Don players
FC Gornyak Uchaly players
FC Ural Yekaterinburg players
FC Fakel Voronezh players
FC Rotor Volgograd players
FC Neftekhimik Nizhnekamsk players
Russian expatriate footballers
Expatriate footballers in Belarus